Joyce Sidman (born June 4, 1956) is an American children's writer. She was a runner-up for the 2011 Newbery Medal.

She graduated from Wesleyan University, with a B.A. in German.
She is married and lives in Wayzata, Minnesota with her husband and their two sons.

Works

Poetry
Like the Air. Georgetown, KY: Finishing Line Press, 1999.

Children's books
Just Us Two: Poems about Animal Dads. Illustrator Susan Swan. Brookfield, CT: Millbrook Press, 2000.

This Is Just to Say: Poems of Apology and Forgiveness. Illustrator Pamela Zagarensky. Boston: Houghton Mifflin, 2007.  

Dark Emperor & Other Poems of the Night|
Ubiquitous: Celebrating Nature's Survivors, Illustrator Beckie Prange, Houghton Mifflin Books for Children, 2010, 
Swirl by Swirl: Spirals in Nature, Illustrator Beth Krommes, Houghton Mifflin Harcourt, 2011, 
Round, Illustrated by Taeeun Yoo, Houghton Mifflin Harcourt, 2017, . Round received Mathical Honors

References

External links

"Interview with Joyce Sidman", Wild Rose Reader, April 18, 2008
"Interview with Joyce Sidman", Class of 2k11, Sheila O'Connor, January 25, 2011 
"Joyce Sidman", Children's Book Almanac

 Joyce Sidman at Library of Congress Authorities — with 14 catalog records

1956 births
Living people
Wesleyan University alumni
American children's writers
Writers from Hartford, Connecticut
Newbery Honor winners
People from Wayzata, Minnesota
20th-century American writers
21st-century American writers
20th-century American women writers
21st-century American women writers
American women children's writers
Writers from Minnesota
Loomis Chaffee School alumni